Milking the Sacred Cow is a compilation album by San Francisco punk rock band Dead Kennedys. Released in 2007, it comprises songs recorded between 1979 and 1985 that originally appeared on the band’s various studio albums and singles. The compilation  also contains two previously unreleased live versions of songs from the band’s Frankenchrist album. Notably, Milking the Sacred Cow contains no material from the Dead Kennedys’ final studio album, Bedtime for Democracy.

Milking the Sacred Cow was compiled and released several years after a lengthy lawsuit, which resulted in the rights to the Dead Kennedys' catalog being transferred from lead singer/songwriter Jello Biafra's record label, Alternative Tentacles to the other three members of the band. 

The album’s title alludes to these band members profiting (the “milking”) from early Dead Kennedys material (the “sacred cow”) by rereleasing them on a compilation. The album has been criticized by former lead singer Jello Biafra.

Track listing 
 "California über alles (7" version)" (Jello Biafra, John Greenway)
 "Police Truck" (East Bay Ray, Jello Biafra)
 "Kill the Poor" (East Bay Ray, Jello Biafra)
 "Holiday in Cambodia (7" version)" (Dead Kennedys)
 "Nazi Punks Fuck Off" (Jello Biafra)
 "Too Drunk to Fuck" (Jello Biafra)
 "Viva Las Vegas" (Doc Pomus, Mort Shuman)
 "Moon Over Marin" (East Bay Ray, Jello Biafra)
 "Halloween" (Dead Kennedys)
 "MTV Get off the Air" (Jello Biafra)
 "Soup Is Good Food" (Live) (Dead Kennedys)
 "Jock-O-Rama"  (Live) (Jello Biafra)

Personnel 
Dead Kennedys
 Jello Biafra – lead vocals; producer on track 10
 East Bay Ray – guitar; producer on tracks 1, 4, 5, 6, 11, 12; mixed tracks 2 & 3
 Klaus Flouride – bass, backing vocals
 D.H. Peligro – drums
 Ted – drums on tracks 1, 2, 3, 4, 7
Technical
 Geza X – producer on tracks 2, 3, 7; engineer on tracks 2 & 3
 Thom Wilson – producer on tracks 8 & 9
 Jim Keylon – engineer on track 1
 Oliver Dicicco – engineer on tracks 4, 5, 6, 7
 John Cuniberti – engineer on tracks 8, 9, 10, 11, 12

References 

2007 compilation albums
Dead Kennedys albums
Albums produced by Geza X
Albums produced by Thom Wilson
Cherry Red Records compilation albums